

Ten ships of the French Navy have borne the name Nymphe:

Ships named Nymphe 
 , a barque 
 , a 24-gun frigate.
 , a 26-gun frigate, bore the name Nymphe during her career.
 , a 14-gun corvette 
 , a 24-gun frigate 
 , a 32-gun frigate 
 , a 40-gun frigate, lead ship of her class 
 , a 44-gun  frigate.
 , a 40-gun  frigate.

Ships with similar names 
 , the ex-German minesweeper M42, built in 1916 and recommissioned by the French Navy.

See also

Notes and references

Citations

Bibliography
 
 

French Navy ship names